Powick is a village and civil parish in the Malvern Hills district of Worcestershire, England, located two miles south of the city of Worcester and four miles north of Great Malvern. The parish includes the village of Callow End and the hamlets of Bastonford, Clevelode, Collett's Green, and Deblins Green.

Powick lies on the A449 and has two bridges across the River Teme, one ancient and one modern. The village contains a primary school, three pubs - The Crown, The Red Lion and The Three Nuns, a garage and a Chinese restaurant/takeaway. It is locally pronounced "Pow-ick" (the "ow" rhyming with the word "mow").

History

Powick Old Bridge

The old bridge across the Teme at Powick is late mediaeval with 17th-century alterations, built of sandstone with brick parapets. It is a grade I listed structure.

In 1642 the bridge was the scene of one of the first skirmishes between Royalist and Parliamentarian soldiers in the English Civil War in what became known as the Battle of Powick Bridge. It was a short, sharp, but decisive cavalry engagement that resulted in a victory for the Royalists and showed the Parliamentarian cavalry their shortcomings, setting the tone for the early stages of the conflict. A long ballad gives a surprisingly detailed account of the battle.

The more famous Battle of Worcester later on in the war, in 1651, was fought in part in much the same locality close to the River Teme, when the two northern-piers of the bridge were destroyed by the Royalists. The church in Powick village was used by the Royalists as a lookout point as it commanded elevated views over the surrounding countryside and the bridge and its approaches. Its tower has a lot of pockmarks from small bore cannon balls which were fired by Parliamentarian gunners to deter the Scottish Royalist forces using the tower. They extend up the south face of the tower from as low as head height up to the top.

Powick Hospital

A mile from the village towards Malvern was the site of the Victorian complex of the county psychiatric hospital, generally referred to as Powick Hospital. The hospital was notorious for its use of LSD in therapy and mistreatment of patients. Built in 1852, the hospital finally closed in 1989 and was mostly demolished shortly thereafter. The name Powick entered the local colloquialisms and became synonymous for mental disorder in many informal expressions relating to madness or stupidity.

Before he became England's most famous composer, in 1879 at the age of 22 Edward Elgar was appointed bandmaster of the asylum until about 1886, and wrote compositions for the asylum's band.

Victorian power station

A former water mill, next to Powick Bridge, was converted in 1894 to become the world's first combined steam/hydro electric power station. Electricity from this mill provided about half the city of Worcester's needs. The Powick site continued generating until the 1950s. When it closed, it was converted into a laundry and has since been converted into residential apartments.

The site was chosen as a mill site from at least the 11th century, and very probably earlier than that. The mill leat was dug in 1291. A succession of water mills replaced each other throughout the Middle Ages and into the 16th century and later. The mill is a Grade II Listed Building.

Notable residents
 John Wall, physician, was born at Powick in 1708.
 James Piers St Aubyn, architect, was born at Powick Vicarage in 1815
 Lord Alfred Douglas, lover of Oscar Wilde, was born at Ham Hill House in 1870.

Gallery

References

External links

Powick parish community web site
Powick primary school
Worcester Museum website - page including Powick Mills
British history online entry
Bell-ringing in Powick
Powick watercolours of Burney

Villages in Worcestershire
Civil parishes in Worcestershire